Taegwan County is a kun, or county, in northeastern North P'yŏngan province, North Korea.  It lies in the province's interior, and is bounded by Tongch'ang on the east, Kusŏng and T'aech'ŏn to the south, Ch'ŏnma to the west, and Ch'angsŏng and Sakchu to the north. It was created in 1952 from portions of Sakchu county.

Geography
Taegwan's borders are mountainous, with the Kangnam Mountains rising in the north and the Chonma Mountains in the west. The Taeryong River (대령강) flows through the county's centre, joined in its course by many fast small streams.

Administrative divisions
Taegwan county is divided into 1 ŭp (town), 1 rodongjagu (workers' district) and 22 ri (villages):

Climate
Taegwan enjoys a relatively rainy climate, with an average annual rainfall of 1300 mm. The average temperature is 7 °C, fluctuating between an average of -11.2 °C in January and 22.5 °C in August.

Economy
Some 83% of the county's area is forested; only 8.5% is cultivated. Most of these are dry fields, with maize the chief crop. Forestry, including lumber as well as the harvesting of wild herbs and fruits, is a major local industry; Taegwan is home to the province's largest lumber base, which specializes in wood for mining and construction applications. Gold and graphite are mined in the county, and a small hydroelectric generator harnesses the Taeryŏng River's stream. It is also home to a ballistic missile factory called No. 301 Factory and an operating missile base to the north of town.

Transportation
The P'yŏngbuk Line of the Korean State Railway passes through the county, on its way between Chŏngju and Ch'ŏngsu.

Education
Educational institutions in Taegwan include the Taegwan Technical School.

See also
Geography of North Korea
Administrative divisions of North Korea
North Pyongan

References

External links

Counties of North Pyongan